Bol Meri Machli is a Pakistani social drama series which premiered on Geo Entertainment. It stars Ayesha Khan, Tooba Siddiqui, Tehreem Zuberi, and Sadia Shaikh in lead roles. The series revolves around the journey of four lower middle-class women and their aspirations. The drama is considered one of the boldest reality-based dramas in Pakistani television history with taboo subjects covering, among others, extramarital affairs, Premarital intercourse, and homosexuality.

At the 11th Lux Style Awards, it won Best TV Play - Satellite out of three nominations.

Plot summary 
Hailing from a lower middle-class family, the daughters of Professor Waheed, Noreen, Sahaab, Rubab, and Maheem get motivated by their father to pursue careers in their fields of interest. However, things don't go according to plan.

Cast
Tooba Siddiqui as Noreen
Ayesha Khan as Sahaab
Tehreem Zuberi as Rubab
Sadia Shaikh as Maheen
Samina Ahmed
Sami Khan
Fahad Mustafa
Shahood Alvi as Majaz Siddiqui
Sabahat Ali Bukhari as Khala
Javed Shaikh
Ayesha Khan as Asma
Azra Mohyeddin as Maheen's mother
Faisal Shah
Mazhar Ali
Behroze Sabzwari
Saife Hassan as Ashar

Accolades

References

Geo TV original programming